Penruddocke is a surname. Notable people with the name include:

Charles Penruddocke (1743–1788), English politician, member of Parliament of England
John Penruddocke (1770–1841), English politician, member of Parliament of the United Kingdom
Thomas Penruddocke (b. c. 1648, d. before 1695), English politician, member of Parliament of England

See also
Penruddock